Kiner is a surname. Notable people with the surname include:

Aline Kiner (1959–2019), French journalist and writer
Harold G. Kiner (1924–1944), United States Army soldier and Medal of Honor recipient
Kevin Kiner (born 1958), American film and television composer
Ralph Kiner (1922–2014), American baseball player
Steve Kiner (born 1947), American football player

See also
Isiah Kiner-Falefa (born 1995), American baseball player